The 8th Government of Slovenia led by  Prime Minister Janez Janša was announced on 3 December 2004. The government was formed after the 2004 Slovenian parliamentary election. It was the first government of Janez Janša, and third centre-right government in the history of the Republic of Slovenia. Slovenian Democratic Party won on the elections 29% of the votes and so became the strongest parliamentary party in the National Assembly. The party nominated Janez Janša as the candidate for the mandatary, who was confirmed by the president Janez Drnovšek. It was one of the most stable governments of Slovenia, which ruled in the times of the greatest economical boom. In 2004–2006, the economy grew on average by nearly 5% a year in Slovenia; in 2007, it expanded by almost 7%. The growth surge was fuelled by debt, particularly among firms, and especially in construction. The price for a boom that veered out of control has been paid in years from 2009 onwards.

Cabinet members came from four parties of the new coalition and Independent candidates:

Slovenian Democratic Party (SDS) - 6 Ministers - 6 Ministers + 1 Minister without portfolio at the end of the term
New Slovenia (NSi) - 4 Minister 
Democratic Party of Pensioners of Slovenia (DeSUS) - 1 Minister 
SLS - 2 Ministers + 1 Minister without portfolio
3 Independent Ministers - 2 Independent Ministerst at the end of the term

Changes from the preceding cabinet
The number of ministries was raised from 16 in the Rop cabinet to 17. It was the third government led by the centre-right party.

Ministry of Education was divided on to two ministries: Ministry of Higher Education and Ministry of Education. The first covered the fields of higher and academic education and the second the fields of primary and secondary education. 
Ministry of Legislation was renamed to Ministry of Justice.

List of ministers and portfolios

History
The first interpelation was given to Minister of Culture Vasko Simoniti in October 2006, which was later refused by National Assembly on 30 of November 2006. 
The first change was made on 27 March 2006 when Jože Damjan was replaced with at the time Independent candidate Andrej Horvat. 
The next change to follow was the replacement of Janez Drobnič, minister of Minister of Social Affairs. The prime minister Janša proposed his dismissal because statements about how to rise fertility in country. Many were also discontented with his work. Marjeta Cotman replaced him on the position. The change of Janez Drobnič trigged a mini coalition crisis as there were many ministers people and Janša were displeased with, among them also Dragotin Mate (poor treatment with Roma minority in Slovenia), Dimitrij Rupel (The Economist marked his diplomatic capabilities as "clumsy"), Jure Zupan , Marija Lukačič (incompetence and difficulties with communication with the media) and Vasko Simoniti who at the time recently "survived" interpelation.
The second interpelation was against the Minister of Health Andrej Bručan that was filed by Liberal Democracy of Slovenia (LDS) on 11 October 2006. The minister underwent the interpelation and continued with his work.
On 30 October 2007 ministers Andrej Bručan (health issues), Janez Božič and Jure Zupan resigned from their positions. Janša accepted their resignation and named new ministers. The new Minister of Health became Zofija Mazej Kukovič, the new Minister for Transport Radovan Žerjav and the new Ministry of Higher Education Mojca Kucler Dolinar.

Composition at the end of the mandate

Former members

See also

2004 Slovenian parliamentary election
Prime Minister of Slovenia
Government of Slovenia
List of cabinets of Slovenia

References

External links
Official website of the Slovenian Government
Chronology of Slovenian cabinets at vlada.si 

Jansa 01
2004 establishments in Slovenia
2008 disestablishments in Slovenia
Cabinets established in 2004
Cabinets disestablished in 2008